Cucurbalsaminol A or cucurbita-5,23(E)-diene-3β,12β,25-triol,  is a chemical compound with formula , found in the Balsam apple vine (Momordica balsamina).  It is a cucurbitane-type triterpenoid, related to cucurbitacin, isolated by C. Ramalhete and others in 2009.

Cucurbalsaminol A is an amorphous powder soluble in methanol and ethyl acetate but insoluble in n-hexane. Unlike Cucurbalsaminol B, it is not cytotoxic.

See also 
 Balsaminapentaol
 Balsaminol A
 Balsaminol B
 Cucurbalsaminol B
 Karavilagenin E

References 

Triterpenes
Polyols